This timeline of Silurian research is a chronological listing of events in the history of geology and paleontology focused on the study of Earth during the span of time lasting from 443.4–419.2 million years ago; the Silurian, and the legacies of this period in the rock and fossil records.

19th century 

1825
 De Kay described the new genus Eurypterus

1835
 Roderick Murchison proposes the Silurian period based on outcrops in Wales and publishes On the Silurian and Cambrian Systems, Exhibiting the Order in which the Older Sedimentary Strata Succeed each other in England and Wales with Adam Sedgwick

1844
 Agassiz described the new genus Pterygotus

1859
 Dawson described the new genus Prototaxites

20th century 

1937
 W. H. Lang described the new genus Cooksonia

1972
 Kjellesvig-Waering described the new genus Brontoscorpio

21st century 
2010
 Gonez and Gerrienne emended genus Cooksonia described by W. H. Lang in 1937

See also 
 History of paleontology
 Timeline of paleontology
 Timeline of Cambrian research
 Timeline of Ordovician research
 Timeline of Devonian research
 Timeline of Carboniferous research
 Timeline of Permian research

References

Silurian
Silurian